Hung is a non-pinyin romanisation of multiple Chinese surnames, based on different varieties of Chinese.

Romanisations of 洪 and 红

Hung is the Mandarin Wade–Giles romanisation of multiple surnames spelled in pinyin as Hóng. The first two of those surnames are also spelled Hung in Hong Kong Government Cantonese Romanisation (the latter is spelled Wang).

Cantonese romanisation of 熊
Hung is a Cantonese romanisation of the surname spelled in pinyin as Xióng. People with this surname include:
Hung Yan-yan (born 1965), Hong Kong martial artist
Lynn Hung (born 1980), Hong Kong model and actress

Cantonese romanisation of 孔
Hung is a Cantonese romanisation of the surname spelled in pinyin as Kǒng. People with this surname include:
Susan Tse (Hung Ling-fook ; born 1953), Hong Kong television actress
William Hung (born 1983), Hong Kong-born American former singer

Other
Adelaida Pérez Hung (born 1959), Cuban actress and radio announcer
María Hung (born 1960), Venezuelan swimmer
Ling-Yue Hung (born 1964), Hong Kong curler
Hung Kai-chun (born 1987), Taiwanese football midfielder
Jenny Hung (born 1991), Taiwanese-born New Zealand table tennis player
Francesca Hung (born 1994), Miss Universe Australia 2018 and Top 20 Miss Universe 2018

References

Chinese-language surnames
Multiple Chinese surnames